Ernest Lundeen (August 4, 1878August 31, 1940) was an American lawyer and politician.

Family and education
Lundeen was born and raised on his father's homestead in Brooklyn Township of Lincoln County near Beresford in the Dakota Territory. His father, C. H. Lundeen, was an early pioneer who was credited with the naming of Brooklyn Township as well as with helping to establish the school and other institutions located there. Most of Ernest Lundeen's brothers and sisters died during a diphtheria epidemic during the 1880s. In 1896, Lundeen and his family moved to Harcourt, Iowa, and then to Minnesota. He graduated from Carleton College in Northfield, Minnesota, in 1901 and then studied law at the University of Minnesota Law School. In 1906 he was admitted to the bar.

Congress
Lundeen served in the United States Army during the Spanish–American War. He served in the Minnesota House of Representatives 1911–14. He then served as a Republican from Minnesota in the United States House of Representatives, from March 4, 1917, to March 3, 1919, in the 65th congress. He was one of 50 representatives to vote against the declaration of war against Germany on April 6, 1917. Owing to the vote, he would lose renomination for the Republican primary in 1918 to the eventual winner, Walter Newton. He served as a Minnesota Farmer-Labor Party member in the House from March 4, 1933, to January 3, 1937, in the 73rd and 74th Congresses.

In 1934, during the 73rd Congress, Lundeen sponsored the Workers' Unemployment Insurance Bill. The bill embodied a far-reaching unemployment insurance and social insurance program formulated by the Communist Party in 1930 and openly and vigorously advocated by the party for the next several years. Despite the bill's Communist origins, the party mustered considerable support for it, including from union locals, international unions, and state labor federations. The bill attracted support from liberals dissatisfied with the less generous and much less radical Wagner-Lewis bill (which became the Social Security Act). With Lundeen's help, a subcommittee of the Labor Committee heard testimony from 80 witnesses on the benefits of the bill and the suffering of the unemployed. Many were Communists, including Party chairman Earl Browder. The bill was narrowly voted out of the Labor Committee, but it was killed by House leadership, which wanted no competition for Wagner-Lewis.

U.S. Senate
Lundeen was elected to the United States Senate in 1936 as a member of the Farmer-Labor Party. He served from January 3, 1937, in the 75th and 76th Congresses until his death. Initially, his Communist sympathies remained strong: in 1936, then Senator-elect Lundeen addressed a meeting of the "Friends of the Soviet Union" at Madison Square Garden as Tovarishchi ("Comrades"). But he remained isolationist and was later denounced by the group as a reactionary.

His isolationist views led him to be sympathetic to Nazi Germany. He had close ties to George Sylvester Viereck, a leading Nazi agent in the U.S. Viereck, after giving the Senator millions of dollars in bribes, often used Lundeen's office, and "sometimes dictated speeches for Lundeen, openly using the Senator's telephones to obtain material from Hans Thomsen at the [German] embassy." Some of these speeches were pro-German and pro-isolationist. Viereck would then have Lundeen's staff print thousands, and in some cases, even millions of copies of the speeches, which would then be distributed to the public.

On June 14, 1939, Lundeen joined a civilian and press delegation aboard USS Hammann for its sea trials off Fire Island. The ship reached a maximum speed of 40 knots, came to a complete stop in 58 seconds, and then travelled in reverse at 20 knots. Lundeen said the experience was "astounding" and that the test showed that American ship designers "need bow to none."

Death and an FBI investigation
On the afternoon of August 31, 1940, Lundeen was a passenger on Flight 19 of Pennsylvania Central Airlines, flying from Washington, D.C. to Detroit. The plane crashed near Lovettsville, Virginia, and all 25 persons on board were killed.  Also on board were "a Special Agent of the FBI, a second FBI employee, and a prosecutor from Criminal Division of the U.S. Department of Justice.

In 2022, Rachel Maddow released a podcast series titled Ultra, which explored Lundeen's complicity in Nazi Germany's intelligence and propaganda operations in the U.S. during the 12 to 18 months immediately preceding America's entry into World War II. At the time of his death, the FBI was investigating Lundeen's ties to George Sylvester Viereck, a top Nazi spy working in the US to spread pro-Hitler and anti-Semitic propaganda.

After the plane crash, Lundeen's wife, Norma Lundeen tried to clear his name by covering up his involvement with the Nazi regime. To do that, within 2 days after the crash, she travelled to his office in the Capitol to retrieve the "Viereck files". Within the year after the tragedy, the story that Lundeen's speeches have been written by Viereck had been reported by several journalists. Norma tried to prevent that narrative by claiming that "no one wrote [her] husband's speeches" and threatening to sue one of the journalists who was reporting on it. Viereck's defense called her as a witness during his trial. Norma then proceeded to falsely testify that she indeed took the Viereck files, but the files are gone due to a burglary that has taken place at their residence. It was later discovered that the files were actually stored in the Lundeen family archives.

See also
 List of United States Congress members who died in office (1900–49)

References

External links
 
 

1878 births
1940 deaths
People from Beresford, South Dakota
Methodists from Minnesota
Accidental deaths in Virginia
American military personnel of the Spanish–American War
American collaborators with Nazi Germany
United States senators from Minnesota
Republican Party members of the Minnesota House of Representatives
University of Minnesota Law School alumni
Minnesota Farmer–Laborites
Farmer–Labor Party United States senators
United States Army soldiers
Republican Party members of the United States House of Representatives from Minnesota
Farmer–Labor Party members of the United States House of Representatives
Carleton College alumni
Victims of aviation accidents or incidents in 1940
Victims of aviation accidents or incidents in the United States